Mahind Naik was a first class cricketer from India, who played for who played for Goa. He played his only first class match in 1999-2000 season and played his only List-A match in 2000-01 season.

See also
List of Goa cricketers

References

External links
Mahind Naik on ESPNcricinfo

Indian cricketers
Goa cricketers
Year of birth missing (living people)
Living people